Robert L. "Bob" Buch (born July 24, 1949) was a Democratic member of the Alaska House of Representatives, representing the 27th District from 2007 to 2011. He was elected in November 2006 defeating the Republican opponent Tom Moffatt by 56.57% to 43.25%. In 2008, Buch won re-election, defeating the Republican Bob Lewis by 72 votes. Buch was defeated in November 2010 by the Republican Mia Costello.

References

External links 
 Alaska State Legislature - Representative Bob Buch official government website
 Project Vote Smart - Representative Robert L. 'Bob' Buch (AK) profile
 Follow the Money - Robert L (Bob) Buch
 2006 2004 campaign contributions
 Alaska's Democratic Caucus - Bob Buch profile
 Robert L. "Bob" Buch at 100 Years of Alaska's Legislature

1949 births
American plumbers
Living people
Democratic Party members of the Alaska House of Representatives
Politicians from Anchorage, Alaska
Politicians from Fond du Lac, Wisconsin
21st-century American politicians